Vincenzo Trusiano Panormo (1734–1813) was an Italian luthier of Irish and English violins. Panormo is thought to have been born in Palermo, Sicily (Panormo is the Latin version of Palermo). He studied violin making in Naples with the Gagliano family of luthiers. From 1753 to 1789, Panormo worked in Paris as a violin craftsman. At the start of the French Revolution, he moved to Dublin, where he worked with Thomas Perry, and then to London where he crafted instruments until his death in 1813. Panormo's violins are considered English with influences by Stradavarius and Amati. Historians note Panormo as one of the finest English violin makers.

Many of the traditional accounts of Panormo's life say that he spent some time working in Cremona for the Bergonzi family. Although no documentary evidence has been found, there is a strong stylistic link between them. The influence of this great master on the London makers of the time, and those that followed, is enormous. Panormo was responsible for introducing the Cremonese style into London. He is also the father of Joseph, George, and Louis Panormo.

References

Further reading

1735 births
1813 deaths
Italian luthiers
People from Palermo